An Se-hyeon (born October 14, 1995) is a South Korean swimmer.

She competed at the 2015 World Aquatics Championships, 2016 Summer Olympics in Rio de Janeiro and 2020 Summer Olympics in Tokyo.

Career
In July 2021, she represented South Korea at the 2020 Summer Olympics held in Tokyo, Japan. She competed in the women's 100 metre butterfly and 4 × 200 metre freestyle relay events. In freestyle event, she did not advance to compete in the semifinal. In the freestyle relay event, the team did not advance to compete in the final.

References

External links
 
 

 

1995 births
Living people
Sportspeople from Ulsan
South Korean female butterfly swimmers
South Korean female freestyle swimmers
Swimmers at the 2016 Summer Olympics
Olympic swimmers of South Korea
Asian Games medalists in swimming
Swimmers at the 2014 Asian Games
Swimmers at the 2018 Asian Games
Asian Games silver medalists for South Korea
Asian Games bronze medalists for South Korea
Medalists at the 2014 Asian Games
Medalists at the 2018 Asian Games
Swimmers at the 2020 Summer Olympics
21st-century South Korean women